Cuts & Bruises is the second studio album by Irish rock band Inhaler. It was released on 17 February 2023 by Polydor Records.

Background
Work for Cuts & Bruises began while touring for their debut album It Won't Always Be Like This in early 2022. Of the process, band member Elijah Hewson told Billboard: "I think we learned a lot of lessons on [It Won't Always Be Like This], and I think when we came into the second we had a better picture of how we wanted to do things. [...] I think the main thing we said is we wanted less information, to let the songs breathe a bit. I think we were just more confident, and you don’t have to add as much if you are confident in the songs and material. And that was the basis of what we went off and I think it guided us pretty well".

Singles
The album's lead single, "These Are the Days", was released on 7 June 2022. The second single, "Love Will Get You There", was released on 13 October 2022. The third single, "If You're Gonna Break My Heart", was released on 1 February 2023.

Critical reception

Upon release, Cuts & Bruises received generally positive reviews from music critics. At Metacritic, which assigns a normalised rating out of 100 to reviews from mainstream critics, the album received an average of 72 based on four critical reviews. Another music aggregator AnyDecentMusic? gave the album 7.2 out of 10 based on their assessment of the critical consensus.

Track listing

Personnel
Inhaler
 Elijah Hewson – vocals, electric guitar (all tracks); synthesizer (1, 3, 7, 8, 10), keyboards (2, 4), background vocals (3, 8, 10), acoustic guitar (6, 7)
 Robert Keating – bass guitar (all tracks), background vocals (1, 2, 4–11), synthesizer (1, 3, 6, 8–11), keyboards (2)
 Ryan McMahon – drums
 Josh Jenkinson – electric guitar (all tracks), background vocals (1, 2, 4–11), synthesizer (1, 3, 6, 8–11); keyboards, percussion (2)

Additional musicians
 Antony Genn – percussion (1–9, 11), drum machine (1), stylophone (1, 3), theremin (1, 3), keyboards (2, 4), background vocals (4), string arrangement (5, 6), synthesizer (7, 11)
 Andrea Cozzaglio – programming
 Drew Dungate Smith – programming (1–9, 11)
 Martin Slattery – Hammond organ (2, 5, 6, 9), piano (5)
 Amy Langley – cello, string arrangement (5, 6)
 Richard Harwood – cello (5, 6)
 Jessie Murphy – violin (5, 6)
 Kotono Sato – violin (5, 6)
 Marianne Haynes – violin (5, 6)
 Rosie Langley – violin (5, 6)

Technical
 Antony Genn – production
 John Davis – mastering
 John Catlin – mixing
 Drew Dungate Smith – engineering
 Andrea Cozzaglio – additional engineering

Charts

References

2023 albums
Polydor Records albums